Shocklach Oviatt and District is a civil parish in the Cheshire West and Chester unitary authority, in the county of Cheshire, England.

The parish was created in 2015, combining the previous civil parishes of  Caldecott, Church Shocklach, Horton by Malpas and Shocklach Oviatt. Settlements in the parish include Caldecott Green, Shocklach, Horton Green, Castletown, Green Croft, Lane End, Little Green, Lordsfields, Port Green, Shocklach Green and The Saughans.

It has a parish council, the lowest tier of local government.

The 2015 mid-year estimate of the parish population was 310.

References

External links

Civil parishes in Cheshire
Cheshire West and Chester